Ultraliga is the 1st level of League of Legends league system in Poland, Lithuania, Latvia, Estonia, Ukraine, Georgia (country) and Israel. The league was created in 2018. Originally, the league covered only Poland. In 2022, Ultraliga also covered the countries that have so far competed in the Baltic Masters – Lithuania, Latvia and Estonia. From the 2023 season, Ultraliga also covers Ukraine, Georgia and Israel. There are 2 seasons in Ultraliga per year.

Starting 2021, at the end of each season, teams receive Year Points. Every 2 seasons (once every year), 2 teams with the least amount of points are playing in Ultraliga promotion/relegation Tournament to defend their spot in the Ultraliga. If they lose, they're relegated to Ultraliga 2nd Division.

Ultraliga is a part of ERLs- EMEA Regional Leagues. Therefore the best teams in the league compete in the EMEA Masters.

List of Ultraliga finals

References

League of Legends competitions